PSS may refer to:

Businesses and organizations

Government and military organizations
Palestinian Security Services, the armed forces and intelligence agencies of the State of Palestine
Parliament Security Services, in charge of providing security to the Parliament of India
Presidential Security Service (South Korea), a South Korean close protection agency

Political parties
Sammarinese Socialist Party, San Marino
Senegalese Socialist Party
Strength of Serbia Movement (Pokret snaga Srbije), a political party in Serbia

Schools

Canada
Parkland Secondary School, North Saanich, Victoria, British Columbia
Penetanguishene Secondary School, Simcoe County District School Board, Ontario
Penticton Secondary School, Penticton, British Columbia
Pinetree Secondary School, Coquitlam, British Columbia
Parkview Secondary School, Hamilton, Ontario

Elsewhere
Park Secondary School, Dudley, West Midlands
Popatlal Secondary School, Tanga, Tanzania

Other businesses and organizations
Price Stern Sloan, a publishing imprint of Penguin
Product Support Services, a Microsoft business unit
PSS World Medical, an American distributor of medical products, equipment, billing services and pharmaceuticals
Pakistan Statistical Society, an academic and professional society of statisticians
Społem or PSS Społem, a Polish consumers' co-operative of local grocery stores
PSS (UK), a British social care charity
Personal Software Services, a defunct British video game publisher

Science and technology

Biology and medicine
Perceived Stress Scale, an instrument for measuring perceived stress in humans
Porcine stress syndrome, a condition in pigs
Portosystemic shunt, a disease found in humans, cats and dogs
Progressive systemic sclerosis, a rare chronic disease
Psychosocial short stature, a growth disorder that is caused by extreme stress

Computing
Packet Switch Stream, a British packet-switched network
Packet switching, a method of grouping data that is transmitted over a digital network into packets
Panorama Software Sys-On-Line
Passenger service system, systems used by airlines to manage reservations, inventory and check-in
Performance supervision system, a software system used to improve the performance of a process plant
Physical symbol system, a hypothesis in artificial intelligence research
Power system simulator for engineering (PSS®E or PSS/E), software to simulate electrical power transmission networks
Probabilistic signature scheme, a secure way of creating signatures with RSA
Proportional set size, a measure of computer program memory use

Physics and chemistry
Periodic steady-state analysis, type of simulation
Physica Status Solidi, a family of academic journals focused on solid state physics
Photostationary state, the equilibrium chemical composition under a specific kind of electromagnetic irradiation
Plasma sound source, a means of making sonar underwater
Polystyrene sulfonic acid, also known as sodium polystyrene sulfonate or poly(styrenesulfonate)
Practical Salinity Scale, the conductivity ratio of a sea water sample to a standard KCl solution

Other uses in technology
PSS silent pistol, a Soviet-designed silent handgun
PortaSound PSS series, a series of portable Yamaha keyboards
Power scale soaring, a form of radio controlled model flying
Power system stabilizer, in power generation; see Wide-area damping control

Sports teams and stadia
Paikiasothy Saravanamuttu Stadium, Colombo, Sri Lanka
Philippine Sports Stadium, Bocaue, Philippines
PFC Septemvri Sofia, a Bulgarian football club
Porvoon Salibandyseura, a Finnish sports club
PSS Sleman, an Indonesian football club

Other uses
Kaulong language (ISO 639:pss), an Austronesian language
Libertador General José de San Martín Airport (IATA code PSS), Posadas, Misiones, Argentina
Player Search System, how Pokémon X and Y players can connect to each other around the world
Project SuperStar (abbreviated PSS), a Singaporean singing reality-competition franchise
Product-service system, a system of consumer access to products, as an alternative to personal product ownership
Psalms, a book of the Hebrew Bible
PSS, a ship prefix meaning Palau State Ship
PSS Nkwen kidnapping, a 2008 kidnapping at Presbyterian Secondary School in Nkwen, near Bamenda, Cameroon
 PSS-line, a fortified defense line in Finland during World War II; see Battle of Nietjärvi

See also